Fabian McCarthy may refer to:
Fabian McCarthy (rugby union) (born 1919), Australian rugby union player
Fabian McCarthy (Jamaican footballer) (born 1990), Jamaican football player
Fabian McCarthy (South African footballer) (born 1977), South African football player